Spilarctia coccinea is a moth in the family Erebidae. It was described by George Hampson in 1907. It is found in the Philippines.

References

Moths described in 1907
coccinea